Stepanovsky (masculine), Stepanovskaya (feminine) is an East Slavic family name. It is also the spelling without diacritics of the Czech and Slovak surname Štepanovský/Štěpanovský. Notable people with the surname include:
Ivan Stepanovsky (1710 - ?), Ukrainian lutenist
Martin Štěpanovský (born  1988), Czech footballer
Peter Štepanovský (born 1988),  Slovak football midfielder